Gmina Jabłonna is a rural gmina (administrative district) in Lublin County, Lublin Voivodeship, in eastern Poland.

Villages
Gmina Jabłonna contains the villages and settlements of
 Chmiel Drugi,
 Chmiel Pierwszy,
 Chmiel-Kolonia,
 Czerniejów,
 Czerniejów-Kolonia,
 Jabłonna,
 Jabłonna Druga,
 Jabłonna-Majątek,
 Piotrków Drugi,
 Piotrków Pierwszy,
 Piotrków-Kolonia,
 Skrzynice,
 Skrzynice Pierwsze,
 Skrzynice-Kolonia,
 Tuszów,
 Wierciszów
 Wolnica.

Neighbouring gminas
Gmina Jabłonna is bordered by the gminas of Bychawa, Głusk, Krzczonów, Piaski and Strzyżewice.

References

Jablonna
Lublin County